The 1983 Preakness Stakes was the 108th running of the $350,000 Grade 1 Preakness Stakes thoroughbred horse race. The race took place on May 21, 1983, and was televised in the United States on the ABC television network. Deputed Testamony, who was jockeyed by Donnie A. Miller Jr., won the race by two and three quarter lengths over runner-up Desert Wine. Approximate post time was 5:42 p.m. Eastern Time. The race was run on a sloppy track in a final time of 1:55-2/5.  The Maryland Jockey Club reported total attendance of 71,768, recorded as second highest on the list of American thoroughbred racing top attended events in 1983.

Payout 

The 108th Preakness Stakes Payout Schedule

$2 Exacta:  (1–7) paid   $174.60

The full chart 

 Winning Breeder: Bonita Farm, (MD)
 Winning Time: 1:55 2/5
 Track Condition: Sloppy
 Total Attendance: 71,768

References

External links 

 

1983
1983 in horse racing
Horse races in Maryland
1983 in American sports
1983 in sports in Maryland